Mansour Jawhar (born 19 March 1995) is a Saudi Arabian professional footballer who currently plays as a goalkeeper for Abha.

References

External links
 

Living people
1995 births
Association football goalkeepers
Saudi Arabian footballers
Al-Shabab FC (Riyadh) players
Al-Qaisumah FC players
Al-Shoulla FC players
Abha Club players
Al-Fayha FC players
Sportspeople from Riyadh
Saudi Arabia youth international footballers
Saudi Professional League players
Saudi First Division League players